In statistics, fixed-effect Poisson models are used for static panel data when the outcome variable is count data. Hausman, Hall, and Griliches pioneered the method in the mid 1980s. Their outcome of interest was the number of patents filed by firms, where they wanted to develop methods to control for the firm fixed effects.  Linear panel data models use the linear additivity of the fixed effects to difference them out and circumvent the incidental parameter problem. Even though Poisson models are inherently nonlinear, the use of the linear index and the exponential link function lead to multiplicative separability, more specifically 

 E[yit ∨ xi1... xiT, ci ] = m(xit, ci, b0 ) = exp(ci + xit b0 ) = ai exp(xit b0 ) = μti				(1)

This formula looks very similar to the standard Poisson premultiplied by the term ai. As the conditioning set includes the observables over all periods, we are in the static panel data world and are imposing strict exogeneity.  Hausman, Hall, and Griliches then use Andersen's conditional Maximum Likelihood methodology to estimate b0. Using ni = Σ yit allows them to obtain the following nice distributional result of  yi

 yi ∨ ni, xi, ci ∼ Multinomial (ni, p1 (xi, b0), ..., pT (xi, b0 ))						(2) where

 

At this point, the estimation of the fixed-effect Poisson model is transformed in a useful way and can be estimated by maximum-likelihood estimation techniques for multinomial log likelihoods. This is computationally not necessarily very restrictive, but the distributional assumptions up to this point are fairly stringent. Wooldridge provided evidence that these models have nice robustness properties as long as the conditional mean assumption (i.e. equation 1) holds.  Chamberlain also provided semi-parametric efficiency bounds for these estimators under slightly weaker exogeneity assumptions. However, these bounds are practically difficult to attain, as the proposed methodology needs high-dimensional nonparametric regressions for attaining these bounds.

See also

References

Econometric models